Conus capreolus is a species of sea snail, a marine gastropod mollusk in the family Conidae, the cone snails and their allies.

Like all species within the genus Conus, these snails are predatory and venomous. They are capable of "stinging" humans, therefore live ones should be handled carefully or not at all.

Description
The size of the shell varies between 36 mm and 65 mm.

Distribution
Thus marine species occurs off East India and in the Andaman Sea.

References

 Sowerby, G.B. III (1870). Descriptions of Forty-eight new Species of Shells. Proc. Zool. Soc. Lond. (1870): 249–259
 Puillandre N., Duda T.F., Meyer C., Olivera B.M. & Bouchet P. (2015). One, four or 100 genera? A new classification of the cone snails. Journal of Molluscan Studies. 81: 1–23

External links
 The Conus Biodiversity website
 Cone Shells – Knights of the Sea
 

capreolus
Gastropods described in 1985